U.S. Route 54 (US 54) is a part of the U.S. Highway System that travels from Griggsville, Illinois, to El Paso, Texas. In the U.S. state of New Mexico, US 54 extends from the Texas state line by Chaparral, New Mexico, and ends at the Texas state line by Nara Visa, New Mexico. Nationally an east–west route but is signed as a north–south route through the state.

Route description
US 54 enters New Mexico in Chaparral as part of the El Paso, Texas metro area network. It also serves as a military highway to connect Fort Bliss in El Paso to Holloman Air Force Base in Alamogordo, New Mexico, (via US 70). Upon entering Alamogordo, US 54 becomes concurrent with US 70. US 54/US 70 then intersects the beginning of US 82 at the north end of Alamogordo (near La Luz). The limit is 60 mph from Alamogordo to Tularosa and 55 mph north of Tularosa, where the concurrency with US 70 ends, and the highway reverts to being two lanes wide and not divided. The highway runs north through the central portion of the state, passing through Carrizozo and intersecting US 380. The route then turns northeast before passing through Vaughn. Upon entering Vaughn, the route is briefly concurrent with US 60 and US 285. In Vaughn, US 285 splits off to the south. Exiting Vaughn, US 60 splits off to the southeast, and the route continues northeast to Santa Rosa where it becomes concurrent with Interstate 40. The highway then exits the state back into Texas at Nara Visa.

Major intersections

References

Transportation in Otero County, New Mexico
Transportation in Lincoln County, New Mexico
Transportation in Torrance County, New Mexico
Transportation in Guadalupe County, New Mexico
Transportation in Quay County, New Mexico
 New Mexico
54